Hypoxia-inducible factor-asparagine dioxygenase (HIF hydroxylase) is an enzyme with systematic name hypoxia-inducible factor-L-asparagine, 2-oxoglutarate:oxygen oxidoreductase (4-hydroxylating). This enzyme catalyses the following chemical reaction:

hypoxia-inducible factor-L-asparagine + 2-oxoglutarate + O2  hypoxia-inducible factor-(3S)-3-hydroxy-L-asparagine + succinate + CO2

Hypoxia-inducible factor-asparagine dioxygenase contains iron, and requires ascorbate.

References

External links 

EC 1.14.11